Mike Elston may refer to:

 Buzz Burbank, media personality whose real name is Mike Elston (born 1953)
 Michael Elston (born 1969), United States lawyer and appointee to the Department of Justice during the administration of George W. Bush
 Mike Elston (American football coach)